Lauren Kim Roche (born 5 November 1961) is a New Zealand author and physician.

Biography 
Roche was born in Miramar, New Zealand, a suburb of Wellington. In 1991, she obtained her medical degree from the University of Otago and a Diploma in Obstetrics at the University of Auckland in 1994.

Published in 1999, her autobiography, Bent Not Broken, was number 4 spot on New Zealand's Bestseller List. Bent Not Broken is available in six countries and five languages and has been adapted into a stage play. Life on the Line, a sequel to Bent Not Broken, was published in 2001.

In 2009, Bent Not Broken was released as an audiobook by Expanded Technologies Incorporated.

The autobiographies chronicle Roche's life experiences which include: child sex abuse, rape, travel from New Zealand to United States as a ship stowaway, 1970's music groupie, prostitution, homosexuality, depression, suicide, bankruptcy, drug abuse, alcoholism, med school, author, radio personality, medical doctor, and special needs children.

In the late 1990s, Dr. Roche and Sharon Raynor hosted the weekly one-hour radio talk show, Doctor, Doctor. The show fielded a wide span of questions from the listeners encompassing topics such as medical issues, sexual orientation, depression, and discrimination.

Roche served as the physician for the Hutt Valley Special Olympics Team and has been columnist for New Zealand's Bella Magazine. She was a practicing physician and motivational public speaker.

Roche retired from practising medicine in 2019.
She subsequently achieved a Diploma in Advanced Applied Writing through NorthTec, then a Masters in Creative Writing - 1st Class Hons - from Auckland University of Technology in 2021.

Lauren released her debut novel Mila and the Bone Man - published by Quentin Wilson Publishing - in September 2022.

Publications

Autobiography 

 1999. Bent Not Broken (Autobiography 1). New Zealand 
 2001. Life on the Line (Autobiography 2). New Zealand 
 2011. Bent Not Broken (Autobiography 3). Kindle USA 
 2022. Mila and the Bone Man (Fiction 1). New Zealand

Autobiography Audio Book
 2009. Bent Not Broken (Autobiography Audio Book). United States

Articles
 2000. Depression New Zealand 
 2003. Grief New Zealand

Novel 

 2022. Mila and the Bone Man

References

External links 

 Lauren Roche from troubled teen stowaway to GP and author. Interview on RNZ, 20 September 2022

1961 births
Living people
New Zealand writers
New Zealand general practitioners
University of Auckland alumni
University of Otago alumni
New Zealand women medical doctors